Sarah Sanguin Carter (born October 30, 1980) is a Canadian-American actress. She is known for her recurring role as Alicia Baker in the superhero series Smallville (2004–2005), Madeleine Poe in Shark (2006–2008), and main role as Maggie in the TNT science fiction series Falling Skies (2011–2015).

Early life
Carter was born in Toronto and raised in Winnipeg, Manitoba. She was in the prestigious Royal Winnipeg Ballet. Carter was also on the debate team and named one of the top three public speakers in the world. She competed in various countries including Austria, England, and Argentina.

After graduating high school, Carter moved to Switzerland where she studied fine arts at Neuchâtel Junior College for one year. She subsequently attended Ryerson Theatre School in Toronto. At some point, Carter took time off from acting, spending time in India and Cuba, where she worked in an orphanage.

Career
Carter's early television career included appearances in Wolf Lake, Dark Angel, and Undeclared, and she was also cast in Final Destination 2. She also appeared in three episodes of Smallville, in which she played fan favorite Alicia Baker, who has a romantic relationship with Clark Kent. In 2006, Carter starred in the film DOA: Dead or Alive, playing the character Helena Douglas, a fighter who enters a martial arts contest. 

Her later television career has included playing the character Madeline Poe, a rookie prosecutor in Shark between 2006 and 2008, appearing in all 38 episodes of the series. In 2009, she also appeared in CSI: NY, as the character Haylen Becall, a forensic school graduate.

Carter became a regular character, Maggie, on the TNT series Falling Skies, which debuted in June 2011. An apocalyptic alien invasion story, season 2 began on June 17, 2012 and concluded on August 19, 2012. Season 3 premiered June 9, 2013. On the heels of Falling Skies airing its series finale in 2015, Carter booked a recurring arc on CBS’ Hawaii Five-0 as a potential love interest to Steve McGarrett.

Music career
Carter released a solo album, Before Three, in December 2009.

She is part of the duo SanguinDrake, founded in 2010. , the band has released four self-produced music videos on their website. On May 12, 2012, SanguinDrake released their first album Pretty Tricks.

Personal life
Since 2014, Carter has been married to Kevin Barth. They have a daughter, Alice Carter.

Philanthropy
On June 19, 2011, Carter was one of thirty-five climbers who scaled Mount Shasta to raise money for the Breast Cancer Fund, for which she is a spokesperson. She has also hiked the West Coast Trail.

Filmography

Film

Television

Awards and nominations

Television

References

External links

1980 births
Living people
Actresses from Toronto
Actresses from Winnipeg
Canadian film actresses
Canadian television actresses
Toronto Metropolitan University alumni
Balmoral Hall School alumni
21st-century Canadian actresses